Anatoly Davydovich Zimon   (20 November 1924 – 22 February 2015) was an honorary professor of the Moscow State Technological Academy, a Doctor of Technical Sciences, Honored Scientist of Russia, Academician of the International Academy of Ecology and Life Safety, veteran of World War II and a retired colonel.

He justified and created a new trend in the field of adhesion, which has a major scientific and practical value and has gained recognition in Russia and abroad. Seven monographs of the author, including two published in the United States amounted to an encyclopedia of adhesion. In the book Decontamination  published in Japan and Germany, based on his own research, he presents the theory and practice of decontamination and testing after the Chernobyl disaster. He has published five scientific books, among them the first time in Physical and Colloid Chemistry Textbooks in Physical and Colloid Chemistry. During the years 1967-2001 he published 26 books, and with a recent re-release this makes 37 volumes and 571 printed pages.

References

External links
 Anatoly Zimon at the  publ.lib.ru 

1924 births
2015 deaths
Soviet people of World War II
Russian chemists
Russian-language writers
Honoured Scientists of the Russian Federation
Soviet engineers
Soviet military personnel of World War II
Textbook writers